Jacek Paczkowski (born September 2, 1981 in Drezdenko) is a Polish footballer who last played for Flota Świnoujście. He previously played in the Ekstraklasa for Zagłębie Sosnowiec.

External links
 

1981 births
Living people
Polish footballers
Lech Poznań players
Zagłębie Sosnowiec players
Flota Świnoujście players
Podbeskidzie Bielsko-Biała players
People from Drezdenko
Sportspeople from Lubusz Voivodeship
Association football defenders